Amitabh or Amitabha may refer to:

Amitābha, an important Buddha in Buddhism
Amitābha Buddha from Hancui, a statue from Hancui, China, now in the British Museum
Amitabh Bachchan, an actor
Amitabh Chaudhry (born 1964/65), Indian banker, CEO and MD of Axis Bank
Amitabha Buddhist Centre, Singapore
Amitabha (bird), an Eocene fossil bird